Wigs 'n' Guns is the second solo album by Sook-Yin Lee, released in 1996 on Zulu Records.

The cover was drawn by Lee's then-boyfriend, cartoonist Chester Brown.

The song "Knock Loud" was covered by Neko Case on her 2001 release Canadian Amp.

Track listing
 Sleep Song
 Poison Lake
 Sandra Dee
 Oh No
 Fresh Air
 Stubborn
 Chan Is Missing
 Knock Loud
 Born Free
 To the Zoo
 Lucky Elephant
 Cats, Cunts and Rubber Cocks
 John Bob John
 Hole in the Wall
 Sweet Dreams (Get Up!)

References

1996 albums
Sook-Yin Lee albums